The Selfish Giant is a folk opera composed and adapted by English songwriter Guy Chambers, based on the short story by Oscar Wilde (as part of The Happy Prince and Other Tales).

Production 
The folk opera was produced by Classic Spring (Dominic Dromgoole's production company) as part of their Oscar Wilde season in a concert staging directed by Bill Buckhurst, designed by Simon Kenny and choreographed by Imogen Knight. It opened at the Royal Theatre, Northampton from 4 to 7 April 2018, followed by a run in London's West End at the Vaudeville Theatre from 10 to 14 April 2018.

Chambers' recording studio released the accompanying soundtrack to the folk opera Sleeper Sounds on 5 April 2018 on CD and digital.

Cast and characters

Track list

References 

2018 musicals
Musicals based on short fiction
Adaptations of works by Oscar Wilde
2018 albums
Folk opera